Pauline Kergomard (24 April 1838 – 13 February 1925) was a French educator. She is known as the founder of the nursery school in France.

Early years 
Pauline Reclus was born in Bordeaux in 1838. Her father was Jean Reclus, inspector of schools of the Gironde.  Her uncle, Jacques Reclus, taught at the Protestant college of Sainte-Foy-la-Grande.  She spent her infancy with her aunt Zéline in Orthez.  On returning to Bordeaux she was a student at a secular institution that became the École normale of Gironde.  She became a public school teacher in the Gironde.   She married Jules Duplessis-Kergomard, a penniless man of letters with little interest in working.

Career 
In 1879 Pauline Kergomard was appointed general delegate for inspection of asylums, with the support of Ferdinand Buisson.  She was named to the post by Jules Ferry.  She was inspector-general of kindergartens from 1881 until 1917.  She was extremely active, attending conferences, dealing with regional and national authorities and campaigning against child poverty and for women's causes.  She traveled throughout France, inspecting schools and communicating her educational philosophy based on respect for the child and the search for fulfillment.

Pauline Kergomard and Charles Defodon co-edited the Ami de l'enfance, the organ of the French maternal educational system.  In 1884 the French Chamber's budget commission considered eliminating all inspectresses general of nursery schools. The L'Ami de l'enfance raised the alarm.  Defodon praised the inspectorate as a French tradition that made use of women's distinctive maternal talents.  Caroline de Barrau noted that nursery schools had been founded as an initiative of women which the state then chose to support.  She disparaged the regime by comparison to its predecessors, who had introduced inspectresses general. The unsatisfactory compromise was to dismiss or retire four of the inspectresses and retain the other four.

From 1886 to 1892 Kergomard was a member of the higher council of public education.  Her work led to reform of asylums and the creation of kindergartens with a completely new and secular system of education.  She attended the 1896 International Feminist Congress in Paris, presided over by Marie Bonnevial, which discussed coeducation.  The Prévost orphanage, the first mixed school in France, received much attention.  She and Léopold Lacour were able to obtain agreement on the final resolution, in favor of changing to a coeducational system in all countries.  In 1897 she co-founded the "People's Union" with Ferdinand Buisson, Maurice Bouchor, Émile Duclaux and Théodore Steeg.

Legacy

In France, as of 2015, 113 educational institutions, many of them beging kindergartens.

There are streets bearing her name at Bordeaux, Paris, Lyon and Dijon, at Ducos (Martinique) and at Casablanca.

A 1,70 F commemorative stamp was issued on the Journée internationale des femmes, 8 March 1985.

See also 

 Nursery Schools of France

Bibliography 

 Galerie enfantine illustres (1879)
 Les Biens de la terre, causeries enfantines (1879)
 L'Amiral Coligny (1881)
 Nouvelles enfantines (1881)
 Une brouille de peu de durée. Les Convives de Gabrielle. Fileuse et couseuse (1883)
 Histoire de France des petits enfants (1883)
 L'Éducation maternelle dans l'école (1886)
 Cinquante images expliquées (album pour les enfants, 1890)
 L'Éducation maternelle dans l'école, deuxième série (1895)
 Heureuse rencontre (1895)
 Les Écoles maternelles, décrets, règlements et circulaires en vigueur (1905)
 Les Écoles maternelles de 1837 jusqu'en 1910, aperçu rapide (1910)
 L'Enfant de deux à six ans

References
Citations

Sources

External links 
 Pauline Kergomard on data.bnf.fr

People from Bordeaux
1838 births
1925 deaths
19th-century French educators
French educators
French Protestants
Officiers of the Légion d'honneur
French educational theorists
20th-century French educators